A footbridge (also a pedestrian bridge, pedestrian overpass, or pedestrian overcrossing) is a bridge designed solely for pedestrians. While the primary meaning for a bridge is a structure which links "two points at a height above the ground", a footbridge can also be a lower structure, such as a boardwalk, that enables pedestrians to cross wet, fragile, or marshy land. Bridges range from stepping stones–possibly the earliest man-made structure to "bridge" water–to elaborate steel structures. Another early bridge would have been simply a fallen tree. In some cases a footbridge can be both functional and artistic.

For rural communities in the developing world, a footbridge may be a community's only access to medical clinics, schools, businesses and markets. Simple suspension bridge designs have been developed to be sustainable and easily constructed in such areas using only local materials and labor.

An enclosed footbridge between two buildings is sometimes known as a skyway. Bridges providing for both pedestrians and cyclists are often referred to as greenbridges and form an important part of a sustainable transport system.

Footbridges are often situated to allow pedestrians to cross water or railways in areas where there are no nearby roads. They are also located across roads to let pedestrians cross safely without slowing traffic. The latter is a type of pedestrian separation structure, examples of which are particularly found near schools.

Early history

The simplest type of a bridge is stepping stones, so this may have been one of the earliest types of footbridge. Neolithic people also built a form of a boardwalk across marshes, of which the Sweet Track, and the Post Track are examples from England, that are around 6000 years old. Undoubtedly ancient peoples would also have used log bridges; that is a timber bridge that fall naturally or are intentionally felled or placed across streams. Some of the first man-made bridges with significant span were probably intentionally felled trees.

Among the oldest timber bridges is the Holzbrücke Rapperswil-Hurden crossing upper Lake Zürich in Switzerland; the prehistoric timber piles discovered to the west of the Seedamm date back to 1523 B.C. The first wooden footbridge led across Lake Zürich, followed by several reconstructions at least until the late 2nd century AD, when the Roman Empire built a  wooden bridge. On April 6, 2001, the reconstructed wooden footbridge was opened, being the longest wooden bridge in Switzerland.

A clapper bridge is an ancient form of bridge found on the moors of Devon (Dartmoor and Exmoor) and in other upland areas of the United Kingdom including Snowdonia and Anglesey, Cumbria, Yorkshire and Lancashire. It is formed by large flat slabs of stone, often granite or schist, supported on stone piers (across rivers), or resting on the banks of streams. Although often credited with prehistoric origin, most were erected in medieval times, and some in later centuries. A famous example is found in the village of Postbridge. First recorded in the 14th century, the bridge is believed to have been originally built in the 13th century to enable pack horses to cross the river. Nowadays clapper bridges are only used as footbridges.

The Kapellbrücke is a  footbridge crossing the River Reuss in the city of Lucerne in Switzerland. It is the oldest wooden covered bridge in Europe, and one of Switzerland's main tourist attractions. The bridge was originally built  1365 as part of Lucerne's fortifications.

An early example of a skyway is the Vasari Corridor, an elevated, enclosed passageway in Florence, Italy, which connects the Palazzo Vecchio with the Palazzo Pitti. Beginning on the south side of the Palazzo Vecchio, it then joins the Uffizi Gallery and leaves on its south side, crossing the Lungarno dei Archibusieri and then following the north bank of the River Arno until it crosses the river at Ponte Vecchio. It was built in five months by order of Duke Cosimo I de' Medici in 1565, to the design of Giorgio Vasari.

Bank Bridge is a famous 25 metre long pedestrian bridge crossing the Griboedov Canal in Saint Petersburg, Russia. Like other bridges across the canal, the existing structure dates from 1826. The special popularity of the bridge was gained through angular sculptures of four winged lions crowning the abutments. They were designed by sculptor Pavel Sokolov (1764-1835), who also contributed lions for Bridge of Lions.

Design 

Design of footbridges normally follows the same principles as for other bridges. However, because they are normally significantly lighter than vehicular bridges, they are more vulnerable to vibration and therefore dynamics effects are often given more attention in design. International attention has been drawn to this issue in recent years by problems on the Pont de Solférino in Paris and the Millennium Bridge in London.

To ensure footbridges are accessible to disabled and other mobility-impaired people, careful consideration is nowadays also given to provision of access lifts or ramps, as required by relevant legislation (e.g. Disability Discrimination Act 1995 in the UK). Some old bridges in Venice are now equipped with a stairlift so that residents with a disability can cross them.

Types

Types of footbridges include:
 Beam Bridge
 Boardwalk
 Clapper bridge
 Duckboards, Timber trackway, Plank road, and Corduroy road
 Moon bridge
 Simple suspension bridge
 Simple truss
 Stepping stones
 Zig-zag bridge

The residential-scale footbridges all span a short distance and can be used for a broad range of applications. Complicated engineering is not needed and the footbridges are built with readily available materials and basic tools.

Different types of design footbridges include:
 Timber footbridges
 Steel footbridges
 Concrete footbridge

Footbridges can also be built in the same ways as road or rail bridges; particularly suspension bridges and beam bridges. Some former road bridges have had their traffic diverted to alternative crossings and have become pedestrian bridges; examples in the UK include The Iron Bridge at Ironbridge, Shropshire, the Old Bridge at Pontypridd and Windsor Bridge at Windsor, Berkshire.

Most footbridges are equipped with guard rails to reduce the risk of pedestrians falling. Where they pass over busy roads or railways, they may also include a fence or other such barrier to prevent pedestrians from jumping, or throwing projectiles onto the traffic below.

Railways 

It was originally usual for passengers to cross from one railway platform to another by stepping over the tracks, but from the mid-19th century onwards safety demanded the provision of a footbridge (or underpass) at busier places. However, in some quieter areas, crossing the line by walking over the tracks is possible.

Catwalk 
Narrow footbridges or walkways to allow workers access to parts of a structure otherwise difficult to reach are referred as  catwalks or cat walks. Such catwalks are located above a stage (theater catwalk) in a theater, between parts of a building, along the side of a bridge, on the inside of a tunnel, on the outside of any large storage tank in a refinery or elsewhere, etc. The walkway on the outside (top) of a railroad cars such as boxcars, before air brakes came into use, or on top of some covered hopper cars is also called a catwalk. With the exception of those on top of railroad cars, catwalks are equipped with railings or handrails.

In developing countries 

Since the early 1980s, several charities have developed standardized footbridge designs that are sustainable for use in developing countries. The first charity to develop such designs was Helvetas, located in Zurich, Switzerland. Designs that can be sustainably and efficiently used in developing countries are typically made available to the public gratis.

Long footbridges 

The record for the longest footbridge in the world was claimed by then New York State Governor David Paterson in an Oct. 3, 2009 Poughkeepsie Journal article about The Walkway Poughkeepsie Bridge across the Hudson River at Poughkeepsie, New York. On July 22, 2017, the Champlain Bridge Ice Structure (a bridge built for bicycles and foot traffic only to parallel the Champlain Bridge from Brossard, Quebec west to Nun's Island (L'ile Des Soeurs) & the Island of Montreal, was measured by a calibrated device as being 7,512 feet (2,292 meters) long or 1.4227 miles or 2.292 km, starting and ending where the treadway rises above the ground and a pedestrian could access the bridge as close as possible to the St Lawrence River.

Sky Bridge 721, the longest pedestrian suspension bridge, which spans in the Králický Sněžník mountain in the Czech Republic, opened in May 2022.

The United Wholesale Mortgage Pedestrian Bridge in Pontiac, Michigan is the longest enclosed pedestrian bridge, completed on October 1, 2021. The 305 metre bridge was part of a $250 million project to UWM's offices, which converted a former warehouse and utilized shipping containers for offices, corridors, and other spaces.

The Walkway Over The Hudson footbridge was originally built for trains, it was recently restored as a pedestrian walkway.

Other footbridges

 Bank Bridge and the Bridge of Four Lions in Saint Petersburg
 Big Dam Bridge between Little Rock and North Little Rock, Arkansas
 Big Four Bridge between Louisville, Kentucky and Jeffersonville, Indiana
 Capilano Suspension Bridge in British Columbia
 Central Elevated Walkway, an extensive network of footbridges in Central, Victoria City, Hong Kong
 Chain of Rocks Bridge near St. Louis, Missouri
 Corktown Footbridge in Ottawa
 Davenport Skybridge in Davenport, Iowa
 Dunlop Bridge at the Circuit de la Sarthe, Le Mans, Sarthe, France
 Esplanade Riel in Winnipeg, Manitoba
 Gateshead Millennium Bridge, London, England
 Goodwill Bridge at Brisbane, Australia
 Gorkha Bridge in the Gorkha District, Nepal
 Ha'penny Bridge in Dublin, Ireland
 Hungerford Bridge and Golden Jubilee Bridges, London, England
 Jade Belt Bridge in the Summer Palace in Beijing
 Bob Kerrey Pedestrian Bridge, Omaha, Nebraska
 Kingsgate Bridge in Durham, England
 Liberty Bridge at Falls Park on the Reedy in Greenville, South Carolina
 Millennium Bridge and the high-level walkways in Tower Bridge in London
 Matagarup Bridge in Perth, Western Australia
 Mishima Skywalk in Mishima, Shizuoka, Japan
 Newport Southbank Bridge between Newport, Kentucky and Cincinnati
 Pont des Arts in Paris
 Ponte Milvio in Rome
 Ponte Sant'Angelo in Rome
 Pushkinsky and Bogdan Khmelnitsky Pedestrian bridges in Moscow
 Rolling Bridge at Paddington Basin, London
 St Elmo Bridge in Valletta, Malta
 Southbank footbridge in Southbank, Victoria
 Shelby Street Bridge in Nashville, Tennessee
 Tournament Bridge* The Waco Suspension Bridge in Waco, Texas
 Pedestrian walkway over the Tropicana – Las Vegas Boulevard intersection in Paradise, Nevada
 Walnut Street Bridges in Harrisburg, Pennsylvania and Chattanooga, Tennessee
 Webb bridge in the Melbourne Docklands
 Willimantic Footbridge in Willimantic, Connecticut

Advantages 
Much rural travel takes place on local footpaths, tracks and village roads. These provide essential access to water, firewood, farm plots and the classified road network. Communities and/or local government are generally responsible for this infrastructure.

Disadvantages 
Pedestrian overpasses over highways or railroads are expensive, especially when elevators or long ramps for wheelchair users are required. Without elevators or ramps, people with mobility handicaps will not be able to use the structure. People may prefer to walk across a busy road rather than climb a bridge, and this may be attributed to being in a hurry, perceiving the safety and security of the footbridge to be low, or simply because of feeling tiredness when climbing the stairs. It is recommended that overpasses should only be used where the number of users justify the costs. The operational concept of the footbridge is based on the notion that pedestrians need to walk a longer distance and exert more physical effort so that the traffic flow is not interrupted. This is not in line with the sustainability goals of the transport system promoting active travel such as walking and cycling. A change of policy to increase safety and walkability could involve transferring that effort of crossing the road to drivers who will need to wait longer so pedestrians can cross the road safely at street level.

Narrow, enclosed structures can result in perceptions of low personal security among users. Wider structures and good lighting can help reduce this.

Gallery

Bicycle bridge 

A bicycle bridge is a bridge designed to be accessible to both bicycles and pedestrians or in some cases only to bicycles.

See also 

Don Burnett Bicycle-Pedestrian Bridge
Footpath
Garden Bridge, London, England
Hoogholtje bridge, Netherlands
Pedestrian separation structure (overpass)
Pedway
Walkway and Canopy walkway
Wildlife crossing

References

External links 

How To Build a Footbridge
Timber Pedestrian Bridge Images

 
Bridges by mode of traffic
Pedestrian infrastructure
Garden features
Landscape architecture